Juan Andrés Mejía Szilard (b. 30 May 1986) is a Venezuelan deputy to the National Assembly representing the state of Miranda.  He is also the political coordinator for his party, Popular Will. 

Mejía heads the National Assembly commission to develop and advance a plan for Venezuela's reconstruction, Plan País. 

As a student, he was president of the Simón Bolívar University student union.  As a candidate for the National Assembly, with Freddy Guevara, he emphasized the role of student protests against Venezuela's President, Nicolás Maduro.

In May 2019, Supreme Tribunal of Justice ordered the prosecution of several National Assembly members for their actions during the failed uprising, including Juan Andrés Mejía.

References

External links
 *
 

1986 births
Living people
Harvard Kennedy School alumni
Popular Will politicians
People of the Crisis in Venezuela
Movimiento Estudiantil (Venezuela)